Abdallah Abdel Razzaq Al Dardari (born 1963) is the United Nations Development Program's Resident Representative in Kabul, Afghanistan. Prior to his appointment in 2019, he worked for the World Bank. He has also served in several positions in the government of the Syrian Arab Republic.

In September 2014, he was appointed as Deputy Executive Secretary of Economic and Social Commission for Western Asia. On this occasion, he has been criticized for never publicly criticizing Bashar Assad’s current Syrian government. He has also been accused of maintaining ambiguous relationships with both the various rebel groups and the Syrian Government.

Early life and education
Mr. Al Dardari was born in 1963 in Damascus, Syria. He is the son of Major General Abdul Razzaq Dardari, commander of the Operations Division in the war of 1973. He holds a Masters in International Political Economy from The University of Southern California, a Bachelors in Economics from the Richmond University and conducted Post Graduate Research at the London School of Economics. He was awarded an Honorary Doctorate from Yalova University in Istanbul.

Career
Mr. Al Dardari began his career as a journalist in Alhayat, pan-Arab daily. Then he became UNDP's Assistant Resident Representative in Syria from 2001 to 2003. He was brought to the government first as Head of the State Planning Commission where he served in from 2003 to 2005. It was there that he started authoring Syria's 10th five-year plan, seen as the blueprint of reforms in Syria from 2006 to 2011. In 2005, Dardari was appointed Deputy Prime Minister of Economic Affairs. Mr. Al Dardari also served as minister of planning from 2006 to 2008. His term ended in March 2011. The office, deputy premiership for economic affairs, was also abolished. He was removed from office due to his conflict with Rami Makhlouf, Bashar Assad's cousin. Mr. Al Dardari joined the United Nations's Economic and Social Commission for Western Asia (ESCWA) in September 2011 he began to serve as the Director of the Economic Development and Globalization Division (EDGD) and Chief Economist.

Personal life
Mr. Al Dardari is married and has three children. He speaks fluent English and French.

References

External links
BBC interview
Syria Today interview
The Daily Star Article on Arab Integration
BBC Radio interview on Syria Crisis
Al Arabiya article
Associated Press article on Rebuilding Syria

1963 births
Living people
Deputy Prime Ministers of Syria
Syrian journalists
University of Southern California alumni
20th-century Syrian economists
People from Damascus
21st-century Syrian economists